Alfred Goonan (3 April 1904 – 22 January 1942) was an Australian rules footballer who played with North Melbourne in the Victorian Football League (VFL).

Family
The son of William Goonan (1868–1957), and Emma Goonan (1866–1925), née Williams, Alfred Goonan was born in North Melbourne on 3 April 1904.

Football

North Melbourne (VFA)
Goonan joined the North Melbourne under 19s and, later, played the last two games of the 1924 season for the North Melbourne VFA team.

North Melbourne (VFL)
He played in North's first ever VFL game, against Geelong at Corio Oval. Playing at forward pocket, he scored North's first score in a game of VFL: a behind. He kicked 1.1 for the match.

Playing against Fitzroy at Arden Street, in North Melbourne's second VFL match, Goonan kicked 4 goals.

Military service
He joined the Australian Imperial Force in 1940 at Mildura, and was deployed to British Malaya in August 1941. After the invasion of the colony by the Japanese Empire, Goonan's battalion fought fiercely, resulting in Goonan being wounded. The battalion fought the Japanese until forced to retreat at the Simpang-kiri River. The battalion left its wounded behind, including Goonan, in the hope that the Japanese would give them medical care. All 110 left behind were executed near Johor in the Parit Sulong Massacre, including Goonan.

See also
 List of Victorian Football League players who died on active service

Footnotes

References 

 World War Two Nominal Roll: Private Alfred Goonan (VX46909), Australian Government: Department of Veterans' Affairs.
 World War Two Service Record: Private Alfred Goonan (VX46909), National Archives of Australia.
 AIF Casualty List: Victoria: Missing Believed Wounded, The Argus, (Friday, 6 February 1942), p.5.
 Roll of Honour: Private Alfred Goonan (VX46909), Australian War Memorial.
 Second World War P.O.W.s and Missing Persons, Australian War Memorial.
 Sportsmen All, The Sporting Globe, (Saturday, 11 April 1942), p.3.
 We Will Remember Them, nmfc.com.au, 20 April 2018.
 Andrew Warland, "The Battle of Bakri, Malaya: 17–20 January 1942 – And the aftermath (updated 11 March 2018)".
 Private Alfred Goonan (VX46909), Commonwealth War Graves Commission.

External links
 

1904 births
1942 deaths
Australian rules footballers from Melbourne
North Melbourne Football Club players
North Melbourne Football Club (VFA) players
Australian military personnel killed in World War II
Australian Army personnel of World War II
Australian Army soldiers
People from North Melbourne